David Mbah is a professor of Mechanical engineering at the University of Lagos. He is a fellow of the Nigerian Academy of Science who was elected into the Academy’s Fellowship at its Annual General Meeting held in January, 2015.
In 2010, he won the Ludwig Mond Award for  outstanding contributions to the field of Engineering.

References

Living people
Nigerian engineers
Academic staff of the University of Lagos
Year of birth missing (living people)